Tokarevka or Tokaryovka may refer to:
Tokarevka, Kazakhstan, an inhabited locality in Kazakhstan
Tokarevka, Russia (Tokaryovka), name of several inhabited localities in Russia